Brzeg railway station is a station in Brzeg, Opole Voivodeship, Poland. The station is part of the Third Pan-European Corridor, linking Dresden - Wrocław - Kraków - Kyiv.

In the years 2009–2010, the railway infrastructure of the station and a 4 km stretch of the adjoining lines was redeveloped. The investment totaled 154 million Polish złoty. The modernisation was completed on 12 January 2012. Both the interior and the exterior of the station itself were thoroughly renovated, at a cost of 4.2 million Polish złoty. The reopening of the railway station was celebrated on 9 February 2012.

History

The railway station in Brzeg, located on the main line between Wrocław and Opole, is one of the oldest stations in Poland, on the oldest railway line in Poland. The railway reached Brzeg in August 1842. The station in Brzeg was built in 1869–1870, and it is a heritage listed building.

Connections 

132 Bytom - Wrocław Główny
288 Nysa - Brzeg
304 Brzeg - Łagiewniki

Train services
The station is served by the following service(s):

Express Intercity Premium services (EIP) Warsaw - Wrocław
Intercity services (IC) Ustka - Koszalin - Poznań - Wrocław - Opole - Bielsko-Biała
Regional services (PR) Wrocław Główny - Oława - Brzeg
Regional services (PR) Wrocław Główny - Oława - Brzeg - Nysa
Regional service (PR) Wrocław - Oława - Brzeg - Nysa - Kędzierzyn-Koźle
Regional services (PR) Wrocław Główny - Oława - Brzeg - Opole Główne
Regional service (PR) Wrocław - Oława - Brzeg - Opole Główne - Kędzierzyn-Koźle
Regional service (PR) Wrocław - Oława - Brzeg - Opole Główne - Kędzierzyn-Koźle - Racibórz
Regional service (PR) Wrocław - Oława - Brzeg - Opole Główne - Gliwice
Regional service (PR) Brzeg - Opole
Regional service (PR) Brzeg - Opole - Kędzierzyn-Koźle
Regional service (PR) Brzeg - Nysa
Regional service (PR) Brzeg - Nysa - Kędzierzyn-Koźle

References 

Brzeg County
Railway stations in Opole Voivodeship
Railway stations in Poland opened in 1842